Space Shuttle Endeavour (Orbiter Vehicle Designation: OV-105) is a retired orbiter from NASA's Space Shuttle program and the fifth and final operational Shuttle built. It embarked on its first mission, STS-49, in May 1992 and its 25th and final mission, STS-134, in May 2011. STS-134 was expected to be the final mission of the Space Shuttle program, but with the authorization of STS-135 by the United States Congress, Atlantis became the last shuttle to fly.

The United States Congress approved the construction of Endeavour in 1987 to replace the Space Shuttle Challenger, which was destroyed in 1986.

NASA chose, on cost grounds, to build much of Endeavour from spare parts rather than refitting the Space Shuttle Enterprise, and used structural spares built during the construction of Discovery and Atlantis in its assembly.

History

Following the loss of Challenger, in 1986 NASA was authorized to begin the procurement process for a replacement orbiter. A major refit of the prototype orbiter Enterprise was looked at and rejected on cost grounds, with instead the cache of structural spares that were produced as part of the construction of Discovery and Atlantis earmarked for assembly into the new orbiter. Assembly was completed in July 1990, and the new orbiter was rolled out in April 1991. As part of the process, NASA ran a national competition for schools to name the new orbiter—the criteria included a requirement that it be named after an exploratory or research vessel, with a name "easily understood in the context of space"; entries included an essay about the name, the story behind it and why it was appropriate for a NASA shuttle, and the project that supported the name. Amongst the entries, Endeavour was suggested by one-third of the participating schools, with President George H.W. Bush eventually selecting it on the advice of the NASA Administrator, Richard Truly. The national winners were Senatobia Middle School in Senatobia, Mississippi, in the elementary division and Tallulah Falls School in Tallulah Falls, Georgia, in the upper school division. They were honored at several ceremonies in Washington, D.C., including a White House ceremony where President Bush presented awards to each school. Endeavour was delivered by Rockwell International Space Transportation Systems Division in May 1991 and first launched a year later, in May 1992, on STS-49.

The orbiter is named after the British HMS Endeavour, the ship which took Captain James Cook on his first voyage of discovery (1768–1771). This is why the name is spelled in the British English manner, rather than the American English ("Endeavor"). This has caused confusion, including when NASA itself misspelled a sign on the launch pad in 2007. The Space Shuttle carried a piece of the original wood from Cook's ship inside the cockpit.  The name also honored Endeavour, the command module of Apollo 15, which was also named for Cook's ship.

On May 30, 2020, Dragon 2 capsule C206 was named Endeavour during the Crew Dragon Demo-2 mission by astronauts Doug Hurley and Bob Behnken in honor of the shuttle, on which both astronauts took their first flights (STS-127 and STS-123 respectively).

Service
On its first mission, it captured and redeployed the stranded INTELSAT VI communications satellite. The first African-American woman astronaut, Mae Jemison, was launched into space on the mission STS-47 on September 12, 1992.

Endeavour flew the first servicing mission STS-61 for the Hubble Space Telescope in 1993. In 1997 it was withdrawn from service for eight months for a retrofit, including installation of a new airlock. In December 1998, it delivered the Unity Module to the International Space Station.

Endeavours last Orbiter Major Modification period began in December 2003 and ended on October 6, 2005. During this time, Endeavour received major hardware upgrades, including a new, multi-functional, electronic display system, often referred to as a glass cockpit, and an advanced GPS receiver, along with safety upgrades recommended by the Columbia Accident Investigation Board (CAIB) for the shuttle's return to flight following the loss of Columbia during reentry on February 1, 2003.

The STS-118 mission, Endeavours first since the refit, included astronaut Barbara Morgan, formerly assigned to the Teacher in Space project, and later a member of the Astronaut Corps from 1998 to 2008, as part of the crew. Morgan was the backup for Christa McAuliffe who was on the ill-fated mission STS-51-L in 1986.

Early milestones

Upgrades and features

As it was constructed later than its elder sisters, Endeavour was built with new hardware designed to improve and expand orbiter capabilities. Most of this equipment was later incorporated into the other three orbiters during out-of-service major inspection and modification programs. Endeavours upgrades include:
 The plumbing and electrical connections needed for Extended Duration Orbiter (EDO) modifications to allow up to a 28-day mission (although a 28-day mission was never attempted; the record is 17 days, which was set by Columbia).
 Updated avionics systems that included advanced general purpose computers, improved inertial measurement units and tactical air navigation systems, enhanced master events controllers and multiplexer-demultiplexers, a solid-state star tracker and improved nose wheel steering mechanisms.
 An improved version of the Auxiliary Power Units (APUs) that provided power to operate the Shuttle's hydraulic systems.

Modifications resulting from a 2005–2006 refit of Endeavour included:
 The Station-to-Shuttle Power Transfer System (SSPTS), which converted 8 kilowatts of DC power from the ISS main voltage of 120VDC to the orbiter bus voltage of 28VDC. This upgrade allowed Endeavour to remain on-orbit while docked at ISS for an additional 3- to 4-day duration. The corresponding power equipment was added to the ISS during the STS-116 station assembly mission, and Endeavour flew with SSPTS capability during STS-118.

Final flights

Endeavour flew its final mission, STS-134, to the International Space Station (ISS) in May 2011. After the conclusion of STS-134, Endeavour was formally decommissioned.

STS-134 was intended to launch in late 2010, but on July 1 NASA released a statement saying the Endeavour mission was rescheduled for February 27, 2011.

"The target dates were adjusted because critical payload hardware for STS-133 will not be ready in time to support the previously planned 16 September launch," NASA said in a statement. With the Discovery launch moving to November, Endeavour mission "cannot fly as planned, so the next available launch window is in February 2011," NASA said, adding that the launch dates were subject to change.

The launch was further postponed until April to avoid a scheduling conflict with a Russian supply vehicle heading for the International Space Station. STS-134 did not launch until May 16 at 08:56 EDT.

Endeavour landed at the Kennedy Space Center at 06:34 UTC on June 1, 2011, completing its final mission. It was the 25th night landing of a shuttle. Over its flight career, Endeavour flew  and spent 299 days in space. Italian astronaut Paolo Nespoli took a series of photographs and videos of the ISS with Endeavour docked. This was the second time a shuttle was photographed docked and the first time since 1996. Commander Mark Kelly was the last astronaut off Endeavour after the landing, and the crew stayed on the landing strip to sign autographs and pose for pictures.

STS-134 was the penultimate Space Shuttle mission; STS-135 was added to the schedule in January 2011, and in July Atlantis flew for the final time.

Decommissioning

After more than twenty organizations submitted proposals to NASA for the display of an orbiter, NASA announced that Endeavour would go to the California Science Center in Los Angeles.

After low level flyovers above NASA and civic landmarks across the country and in California, it was delivered to Los Angeles International Airport (LAX) on September 21, 2012. The orbiter was slowly and carefully transported through the streets of Los Angeles and Inglewood three weeks later, from October 11–14 along La Tijera, Manchester, Crenshaw, and Martin Luther King, Jr. Boulevards to its final destination at the California Science Center in Exposition Park.

Endeavours route on the city streets between LAX and Exposition Park was meticulously measured and each move was carefully choreographed. In multiple locations, there were only inches of clearance for the Shuttle's wide wings between telephone poles, apartment buildings and other structures. Many street light standards and traffic signals were temporarily removed as the Shuttle passed through. It was necessary to remove over 400 street trees as well, some of which were fairly old, creating a small controversy. However, the removed trees were replaced two-for-one by the Science Center, using part of the $200 million funding for the move.

The power had to be turned off and power carrying poles had to be removed temporarily as the orbiter crept along Manchester, to Prairie Avenue, then Crenshaw Boulevard. News crews lined the streets along the path with visible news personalities in the news trucks. Police escorts and other security personnel, among them including the LAPD, LASD, CHP, and NASA officials, controlled the large crowds gathered, with support from the LAFD and LACoFD to treat heat exhaustion victims as Endeavour made its way through the city. Endeavour was parked for a few hours at the Great Western Forum where it was available for viewing. The journey was famous for an unmodified Toyota Tundra pickup truck pulling the Space Shuttle across the Manchester Boulevard Bridge. The Space Shuttle was mainly carried by four self-propelled robotic dollies throughout the  journey. However, due to bridge weight restrictions, Endeavour was moved onto the dolly towed by the Tundra. After it had completely crossed the bridge, the Space Shuttle was returned to the robotic dollies. The footage was later used in a commercial for the 2013 Super Bowl.  Having taken longer than expected, Endeavour finally reached the Science Center on October 14.

The exhibit was opened to the public on October 30, 2012, at the temporary Samuel Oschin Space Shuttle Endeavour Display Pavilion of the museum. A new addition to the Science Center, called the Samuel Oschin Air and Space Center, is under construction as Endeavours permanent home. Before the opening, Endeavour will be mounted vertically with an external tank and a pair of solid rocket boosters in the Shuttle stack configuration. One payload door will be opened out to reveal a demonstration payload inside.

After its decommissioning, Endeavours Canadarm (formally the 'Shuttle Remote Manipulator System') was removed in order to be sent to the Canadian Space Agency's John H. Chapman Space Centre in Longueuil, Quebec, a suburb of Montreal, where it was to be placed on display.  In a Canadian poll on which science or aerospace museum should be selected to display the Canadarm, originally built by SPAR Aerospace, the Canadian Space Agency's headquarters placed third to last with only 35 out of 638 votes. Endeavours Canadarm has since gone on permanent display at the Canada Aviation and Space Museum in Ottawa.

In August 2015 NASA engineers went to work on removing a few of the tanks from Endeavour for reuse as storage containers for potable water on the International Space Station.

Flights

‡ Longest shuttle mission for Endeavour

Tribute and mission insignias

Flow Directors
The Flow Director was responsible for the overall preparation of the Shuttle for launch and processing it after landing, and remained permanently assigned to head the spacecraft's ground crew while the astronaut flight crews changed for every mission. Each Shuttle's Flow Director was supported by a Vehicle Manager for the same spacecraft. Space Shuttle Endeavours Flow Directors were:

 01/1991 – ?: John J. "Tip" Talone Jr. (previously Flow Director for Discovery)
 08/2000 – 05/2006: Tassos Abadiotakis
 STS-126 --- Ken Tenbusch
 Until 08/2012: Dana M. Hutcherson

California Science Center
Endeavour is currently housed in a temporary structure, the Samuel Oschin Pavilion at the California Science Center, located in Exposition Park in South Los Angeles about two miles south of Downtown Los Angeles. A companion exhibit, "Endeavour: The California Story", features images and artifacts that relate the Space Shuttle program to California, where the orbiters were originally constructed.

Plans for a permanent home for Endeavour, the Samuel Oschin Air and Space Center, are planned with Endeavour attached to an external Space Shuttle fuel tank (the last mission-ready one in existence as all others were destroyed during launch) and the two solid rocket boosters (SRBs) and raised in an upright position, as if Endeavour were to make one more flight.  Endeavour is on display at the museum, the SRBs are in storage, and the external tank ET-94 is on display: ET-94 is currently undergoing restoration after being used to analyze the foam on its sister tank, which was a factor in the failure of STS-107. Originally slated to open in 2015, construction began on June 1, 2022, on the permanent home of Endeavour.

Legacy
Following their May 30, 2020, launch on board the SpaceX Crew Dragon Demo-2 vehicle, the crew announced in orbit that they had named their spacecraft Endeavour. Astronauts Bob Behnken and Doug Hurley said the name has a dual meaning: first, after the "incredible endeavor" put forth by SpaceX and NASA after the retirement of the Space Shuttle fleet in 2011; and second, because both Hurley and Behnken each flew their first flight aboard the shuttle Endeavour (Behnken on STS-123, Hurley on STS-127) and wanted to name this new spacecraft after the one that took each of them into space. The shuttle appeared in the 2022 films Moonfall and Beavis and Butt-Head Do the Universe.

Replica 
A replica of a section of Endeavour is on exhibit outside the Discovery Science Center in Orange County, California.

See also

 List of human spaceflights
 List of Space Shuttle crews
 List of Space Shuttle missions
 Timeline of Space Shuttle missions

References

External links

NASA—Shuttle Orbiter Endeavour (OV-105) homepage 
California Science Center: Space Shuttle Endeavour homepage—final home in Exposition Park, Los Angeles
Stickrboo.com: Endeavour
Endeavour during STS-126 mission—MPLM visible in Payload Bay
Image of Space Shuttle Endeavour docked to ISS during STS-127—created using a telescope mounted camera by astrophotographer Ralf Vandebergh
Transition & Retirement Processing in OPF-2 —  over, under, around and through Endeavour with high-resolution spherical panoramas
Consolidated Launch Manifest (2007)—Space Shuttle Flights and ISS Assembly Sequence
Endeavour's trek through L.A.

Endeavour
Historic American Engineering Record in Texas
Individual aircraft
Individual rockets
Endeavour